Cecil Exum (born August 7, 1962) is an American-Australian former professional basketball player.  He played a number of years in the Australian National Basketball League. He is the father of National Basketball Association (NBA) player Dante Exum.

College career
Exum, a 6'6 forward from Dudley, North Carolina, played collegiate basketball for coach Dean Smith at the University of North Carolina from 1980 to 1984.  At UNC, Exum was a member of the Tar Heels' 1982 NCAA championship team as a sophomore with future Hall of Fame players James Worthy and Michael Jordan.

Professional career
Although Exum played sparingly at UNC, he was drafted by the Denver Nuggets in the ninth round of the 1984 NBA Draft (194th pick overall).

Exum found his niche playing professionally in Australia.  He played seven years in the NBL as a member of the North Melbourne Giants, Melbourne Tigers and Geelong Supercats. For his career, he averaged 10.7 points and 6.9 rebounds per game.

Personal
Exum resides in the Melbourne suburb of Seabrook. He is the father of the fifth overall pick in the 2014 NBA draft, Dante Exum.

References 

1962 births
Living people
African-American basketball players
American emigrants to Australia
American expatriate basketball people in Australia
American men's basketball players
Basketball players from North Carolina
Denver Nuggets draft picks
Geelong Supercats players
Melbourne Tigers players
North Carolina Tar Heels men's basketball players
North Melbourne Giants players
Small forwards
21st-century African-American people
20th-century African-American sportspeople